Red Hot Chili Peppers (RHCP) is an American funk rock band from Los Angeles, California. Formed in December 1982, the group originally consisted of vocalist Anthony Kiedis, guitarist Hillel Slovak, bassist Flea (real name Michael Balzary) and drummer Jack Irons. The group changed its name to Red Hot Chili Peppers on March 25, 1983. In December, Slovak and Irons both left RHCP, after their other band What Is This? obtained a record deal with MCA Records. They were replaced before the end of the year by Jack Sherman and Cliff Martinez, respectively, who performed on the group's self-titled debut album. After the resulting promotional concert tour ended in December 1984, Sherman was fired following tensions with Kiedis and Flea.

Having recently left What Is This?, Slovak returned to RHCP in January 1985. During the tour in promotion of Freaky Styley, Martinez was replaced by the returning Jack Irons, who rejoined in April 1986 to mark the reunion of the group's original lineup. The Uplift Mofo Party Plan was released in 1987. However, after struggling with a heroin addiction for a number of years, Slovak died of an overdose on June 25, 1988 following the conclusion of the album's promotional tour. In the wake of the guitarist's death, Irons decided to leave the group. Kiedis and Flea decided to continue, adding DeWayne McKnight on guitar and D. H. Peligro on drums in August. McKnight was fired the following month and replaced by John Frusciante; Peligro was also dismissed in November, with Chad Smith taking over the following month.

With its new lineup finalised, RHCP released two successful albums in Mother's Milk and Blood Sugar Sex Magik. On May 7, 1992, however, Frusciante abruptly quit the band in the middle of the Blood Sugar Sex Magik Tour, with several shows cancelled as a result. Arik Marshall was brought in for the remainder of the tour, before Jesse Tobias took his place the following September. Before the end of the month, however, former Jane's Addiction guitarist Dave Navarro – the band's first choice to replace Frusciante – had finally agreed to join the group. The band released One Hot Minute in 1995 and toured extensively in promotion of the album. By April 1998, however, Navarro had left RHCP due to creative differences, and his desire to focus on new band Spread. Frusciante returned to the band a few weeks later.

The lineup of Red Hot Chili Peppers remained constant for more than ten years following Frusciante's return, as the band continued to increase its mainstream success with 1999's Californication, 2002's By the Way and 2006's Stadium Arcadium. After a brief hiatus starting in 2008, however, it was announced in December 2009 that the guitarist had departed for a second time, explaining that "my musical interests have led me in a different direction". Despite the time of the announcement, Frusciante had actually left on July 29, 2009. Josh Klinghoffer, previously a touring guitarist for the band, had taken his place when the band returned from its hiatus in October. The band released I'm with You in 2011 and The Getaway in 2016. On December 15, 2019, the band announced through their Instagram account the departure of Josh Klinghoffer and the subsequent return of John Frusciante as the lead guitarist of the band. This event marked Frusciante's second comeback, in this occasion after 10 years of absence. The band released Unlimited Love and Return of the Dream Canteen in 2022.

Members

Current

Former

Touring

Timeline

Lineups

References

External links
Red Hot Chili Peppers official website

Red Hot Chili Peppers